François Négrier may refer to:
 General François-Marie-Casimir Négrier (1788–1848)
 General François Oscar de Négrier (1839–1913)